Czarna may refer to the following places:
Czarna, Lesser Poland Voivodeship (south Poland)
Czarna, Łódź Voivodeship (central Poland)
Czarna, Lublin Voivodeship (east Poland)
Czarna, Dębica County in Subcarpathian Voivodeship (south-east Poland)
Czarna, Kielce County in Świętokrzyskie Voivodeship (south-central Poland)
Czarna, Końskie County in Świętokrzyskie Voivodeship (south-central Poland)
Czarna, Łańcut County in Subcarpathian Voivodeship (south-east Poland)
Czarna, Bieszczady County in Subcarpathian Voivodeship (south-east Poland)
Czarna, Mińsk County in Masovian Voivodeship (east-central Poland)
Czarna, Nowy Dwór Mazowiecki County in Masovian Voivodeship (east-central Poland)
Czarna, Wołomin County in Masovian Voivodeship (east-central Poland)
Czarna, Lubusz Voivodeship (west Poland)

Other uses
Czarna, tributary of the Łęg, in Subcarpathian Voivodeship (south-eastern Poland)

See also
Czarni (disambiguation)